Zafar Alam is an Indian politician in the Rashtriya Janata Dal party. He was elected as a member of the Bihar Legislative Assembly from Simri Bakhtiarpur on 24 October 2019.

References

Rashtriya Janata Dal politicians
Living people
Bihar MLAs 2015–2020
Year of birth missing (living people)